The Premio Presidente della Repubblica is an Italian award introduced by the former president and academic Luigi Einaudi. Since 1949 it has been awarded on a regular basis by the Accademia dei Lincei, the Accademia di San Luca, and the Accademia Nazionale di Santa Cecilia. It is among the most distinguished awards of the three prestigious academies.

History 
The award was established on 11 October 1948 by Luigi Einaudi with a letter to the president of the Lincei National Academy to continue the tradition of royal awards. The prize was first introduced to the class of physical, mathematical, and natural sciences and the class of moral, historical, and philological sciences. 

In the same year, Einaudi established a national prize for artists and architects awarded by the academies of San Luca and Santa Cecilia. The prize is given by the President of Italy in charge in an official ceremony. Among the people awarded, there are several winners of other important awards such as the Nobel Prize, the Wolf Prize, and the Academy Award.

Prize recipients

See also 

 Accademia dei Lincei
 Accademia di San Luca
 Accademia Nazionale di Santa Cecilia
 President of Italy

References

External links 
 

Architecture awards
Italian art awards
Italian music awards
Physics awards
Science and technology awards
Sculpture awards